Gideon Hiram Hollister (December 14, 1817 – March 24, 1881) was an American politician, diplomat, and author.

Biography
Hollister, son of Gideon Hollister, was born in Washington, Litchfield County, Conn., December 14, 1817.

He graduated from Yale College in 1840. After studying law in Litchfield with the Hon. Origen S. Seymour, he was admitted to the bar in April, 1842. He began practice in Woodbury, Conn., but soon removed to Litchfield, where, in 1843, he was appointed Clerk of the Court, an office which he held—a single year excepted—until 1852. In 1856 he was elected to the Connecticut State Senate, and in February, 1868, was appointed by President Andrew Johnson Minister of the United States to Hayti, but was recalled by President Ulysses S. Grant in September, 1869. He then resumed the practice of law, in company with his brother in Bridgeport, Conn, but in 1876 returned to Litchfield. In 1880 he represented the town in the Connecticut Legislature, as a Democrat. He died in Litchfield, after about a week's illness, of suffusion of the heart, March 24, 1881, in his 64th year.

In June 1847, he married Mary S. Brisbane, a native of Charleston, South Carolina, who survived him with one only of their four children.

Hollister was best known as the author of a History of Connecticut, in two volumes, published in 1855. A revised edition was about to appear at the time of his death. He also published, in 1851, an historical romance, entitled Mount Hope, or Philip, King of the Wampanoags, which his maturer judgment disapproved as too florid in style, and a tragic poem, in 1866, entitled Thomas a Becket, which was dramatized and played by Edwin Booth, besides other minor poems.

External links

 Memorials of Connecticut Judges and Attorneys

1817 births
1881 deaths
People from Washington, Connecticut
Yale College alumni
Connecticut lawyers
Connecticut state senators
Members of the Connecticut House of Representatives
19th-century American historians
American male novelists
Ambassadors of the United States to Haiti
19th-century American poets
American male poets
19th-century American novelists
19th-century American politicians
19th-century American male writers
Politicians from Litchfield, Connecticut
American male non-fiction writers
19th-century American lawyers
Historians from Connecticut